Aldo Emmanuel Llanas Valdez (born 7 February 2003) is a Mexican professional footballer who plays as an attacking midfielder for Liga MX club Toluca.

Career statistics

Club

Notes

References

External links
 
 
 

Living people
2003 births
Association football midfielders
Mexican footballers
Liga MX players
Deportivo Toluca F.C. players
Footballers from Coahuila
Sportspeople from Monclova